Bonafide is the fourth studio album by the English pop/reggae singer Maxi Priest. It was released in 1990 by Charisma Records. The album peaked at number 47 on the Billboard 200 in the United States, while its biggest hit, "Close to You", was a smash, peaking at number one that year.

Three other singles were issued: "Human Work of Art" ("Close to You"'s predecessor, which did not chart in the US), "Just a Little Bit Longer" (a minor hit at 62) and "Space in My Heart" (failed to chart).  However, the success of "Close to You" (a gold single on 30 October 1990) drove the album to gold status, which it received on 30 January 1991 by the Recording Industry Association of America.

Critical reception
The AllMusic review by Ron Wynn stated: "Priest scored a #1 pop hit with 'I Just Want to Be Close to You' from this album, which is more pop/R&B with a reggae touch than it is real reggae." The Los Angeles Times wrote that the album "avoids the scattershot syndrome that often afflicts projects with multiple producers." The Milwaukee Sentinel called Bonafide a "tour de force" and "smooth, seductive, stylistic and very, very addictive."

Track listing

Personnel
Maxi Priest – vocals, executive producer
Cleveland "Clevie" Browne – drums, percussion
Luís Jardim, Erskine Thompson – percussion
Peter D. Rose – keyboards, drums, percussion, drum programming
Sly Dunbar – drums, percussion, drum programming
Leo Grant – keyboards
Nellee Hooper – drums, percussion
Robert Lyn – bass, keyboards
Carlton Ogilvie – keyboards, drum programming
Martin Phillipps – keyboards
Dennis Rollins – trumpet
Robbie Shakespeare – bass
Handel Tucker – keyboards, drum programming
Stanley Andrews – guitars
Danny Browne – guitars, piano
 Margo Sagov – backing vocals

Charts

Certifications

References

1990 albums
Charisma Records albums
Albums produced by Nellee Hooper
Maxi Priest albums